Pimpri Lokai is a village in Rahata taluka of Ahmednagar district in the Indian state of Maharashtra.

Population
Population of village is 1,297 as of 2011 census. Out of total, 674 are males and 623 are females.

Economy
Main occupation of village is agriculture.

Transport

Road
Nearby villages Kakdi, Adgaon Khurd, Kelwad are connected by rural roads.

Rail
Sainagar Shirdi railway station is the nearest railway station to a village.

Air
Shirdi Airport is located near a village.

See also
List of villages in Rahata taluka

References 

Villages in Ahmednagar district